Victoria Nicolls, (born February 1954) often misspelt as Victoria Nicholls, is an Australian actress and television personality. Nicolls is well remembered by viewers for appearing in the Australian game show Sale of the Century as a hostess from 1980 to 1982. She is also noted for her dramatic roles, such as Raeleen Archer in The Restless Years in the late 1970s, and as officer Heather Rodgers in Prisoner in 1984. In 1995 she was a leading cast member of the soap opera Echo Point.

Discography

Studio albums

Singles

Filmography

FILM

TELEVISION

References

20th-century Australian actresses
21st-century Australian actresses
1954 births
Australian film actresses
Australian soap opera actresses
Australian game show hosts
Living people